Philip Wykeham-Martin (18 January 1829 – 31 May 1878) was an English Liberal politician who sat in the House of Commons from 1856 to 1878.

Martin was the son of Charles Wykeham-Martin of Leeds Castle and his wife Lady Jemima Isabella Cornwallis daughter of James Mann, 5th Earl Cornwallis. His father was a Member of Parliament (MP) for Newport.  Martin was educated at Eton College and at Balliol College, Oxford graduating BA in 1850. He was a J.P. for Warwickshire, and a captain in the Warwickshire Yeomanry Cavalry.
 
In February 1856 Martin was elected at a by-election as an MP for the borough of Rochester in Kent. He held the seat until his death aged 49 in 1878. In parliament he introduced and carried the "Sale of Spirits Amendment Act" and the "Hotel Keepers' Liability Act".

Martin died in the House of Commons Library on 31 May 1878; the House adjourned upon learning the news.

Family
Martin  married Elizabeth Warde daughter of John Warde in 1850. They had a son Cornwallis Philip Martin.

References

External links

1829 births
1878 deaths
English justices of the peace
Liberal Party (UK) MPs for English constituencies
UK MPs 1852–1857
UK MPs 1857–1859
UK MPs 1859–1865
UK MPs 1865–1868
UK MPs 1868–1874
UK MPs 1874–1880
People educated at Eton College
Alumni of Balliol College, Oxford
Warwickshire Yeomanry officers